The 18th César Awards ceremony, presented by the Académie des Arts et Techniques du Cinéma, honoured the best French films of 1992 and took place on 8 March 1993 at the Théâtre des Champs-Élysées in Paris. The ceremony was chaired by Marcello Mastroianni and hosted by Frédéric Mitterrand. Savage Nights won the award for Best Film.

Winners and nominees
The winners are highlighted in bold:

Best Film:Savage Nights, directed by Cyril CollardLa Crise, directed by Coline SerreauIndochine, directed by Régis WargnierL.627, directed by Bertrand TavernierLe petit prince a dit, directed by Christine PascalUn coeur en hiver, directed by Claude Sautet
Best Foreign Film:Tacones lejanos, directed by Pedro AlmodóvarL'Amant, directed by Jean-Jacques AnnaudHowards End, directed by James IvoryHusbands and Wives, directed by Woody AllenThe Player, directed by Robert Altman
Best Debut:Les Nuits fauves, directed by Cyril CollardNord, directed by Xavier BeauvoisRiens du tout, directed by Cédric KlapischLa Sentinelle, directed by Arnaud DesplechinLe Zèbre, directed by Jean Poiret
Best Actor:Claude Rich, for Le SouperVincent Lindon, for La CriseRichard Berry, for Le petit prince a ditClaude Brasseur, for Le SouperDaniel Auteuil, for Un coeur en hiver
Best Actress:Catherine Deneuve, for IndochineJuliette Binoche, for DamageAnémone, for Le petit prince a ditEmmanuelle Béart, for Un coeur en hiverCaroline Cellier, for Le Zèbre
Best Supporting Actor:André Dussollier, for Un coeur en hiverPatrick Timsit, for La CriseJean Yanne, for IndochineJean-Pierre Marielle, for Max & JeremieFabrice Luchini, for Le Retour de Casanova
Best Supporting Actress:Dominique Blanc, for IndochineZabou Breitman, for La CriseMichèle Laroque, for La CriseMaria Pacôme, for La CriseBrigitte Catillon, for Un coeur en hiver
Most Promising Actor:Emmanuel Salinger, for La SentinelleJulien Rassam, for L'AccompagnatriceOlivier Martinez, for Xavier Beauvois, for NordGrégoire Colin, for Olivier, Olivier
Most Promising Actress:Romane Bohringer, for Les Nuits fauvesIsabelle Carré, for Beau fixeElsa Zylberstein, for Beau fixeLinh Dan Pham, for IndochineCharlotte Kady, for L.627
Best Director:Claude Sautet, for Un coeur en hiverRégis Wargnier, for IndochineBertrand Tavernier, for L.627Cyril Collard, for Les Nuits fauvesChristine Pascal, for Le petit prince a dit
Best Writing:Coline Serreau, for La CriseMichel Alexandre, Bertrand Tavernier, for L.627Cyril Collard, Claude Sautet, for Les Nuits fauvesArnaud Desplechin, for La SentinelleJacques Fieschi, for Un coeur en hiver
Best Cinematography:François Catonné, for IndochineYves Angelo, for L'Accompagnatrice and Un coeur en hiverRobert Fraisse, for L'Amant
Best Costume Design:Sylvie de Segonzac, for Le SouperYvonne Sassinot de Nesle, for L'AmantPierre-Yves Gayraud, Gabriella Pescucci, for Indochine
Best Sound:Dominique Hennequin, Guillaume Sciama, for IndochinePaul Lainé, Gérard Lamps, for L'AccompagnatricePierre Lenoir, Jean-Paul Loublier, for Un coeur en hiver
Best Editing:Lise Beaulieu, for Les Nuits fauvesNoëlle Boisson, for L'AmantGeneviève Winding, for Indochine 
Best Music:Gabriel Yared, for L'AmantGeorges Delerue, for Diên Biên PhuPatrick Doyle, for IndochineRené-Marc Bini, for Les Nuits fauves
Best Production Design:Jacques Bufnoir, for IndochineHoang Thanh At, for L'AmantFrançois de Lamothe, for Le Souper
Best Animated Short:Le Balayeur, directed by Serge ElissaldeHammam, directed by Florence Miailhe
Best Fiction Short:Versailles Rive-Gauche, directed by Bruno PodalydèsOmnibus, directed by Sam Karmann
Honorary César:Jean MaraisMarcello MastroianniGérard Oury

See also
 65th Academy Awards
 46th British Academy Film Awards

External links
 Official website
 
 18th César Awards at AlloCiné

1993
1993 film awards
Cesar